Vilhena is a municipality in Rondônia, Brazil. It may also refer to:
Vilhena Esporte Clube, a football club in Vilhena, Brazil
Vilhena Airport, an airport in Vilhena, Brazil
Macasinia vilhena, a moth found in Rondônia, Brazil

Places
Floriana, a town in Malta also known as Borgo Vilhena
Villena, a city in Valencia, Spain
Palazzo Vilhena, a palace in Mdina, Malta

People
, Spanish noble family
Sancho Manoel de Vilhena, a Portuguese aristocrat and military leader
António Manoel de Vilhena, a Portuguese aristocrat and Grand Master
Tonny Vilhena, a Dutch footballer

Portuguese-language surnames